Alepidea is a genus of about 30 species in the family Apiaceae, all of which are endemic to Africa. They occur mainly in southern Africa, but can be found as far north as Ethiopia.

Species
, Plants of the World Online accepted the following species:

Alepidea acutidens Weim.
Alepidea amatymbica Eckl. & Zeyh.
Alepidea angustifolia Schltr. & H.Wolff
Alepidea attenuata Weim.
Alepidea calocephala Schltr. & H.Wolff
Alepidea capensis (P.J.Bergius) R.A.Dyer
Alepidea cirsiifolia Schltr. & H.Wolff
Alepidea comosa Dümmer
Alepidea concinna Dümmer
Alepidea cordifolia B.-E.van Wyk
Alepidea delicatula Weim.
Alepidea duplidens Weim.
Alepidea galpinii Dümmer
Alepidea inflexa S.-L.Hutch. & Magee
Alepidea insculpta Hilliard & B.L.Burtt
Alepidea jenkinsii R.Pott
Alepidea longeciliata Schinz ex Dümmer
Alepidea longipetiolata Schltr. & H.Wolff
Alepidea macowanii Dümmer
Alepidea multisecta B.L.Burtt
Alepidea natalensis J.M.Wood & M.S.Evans
Alepidea peduncularis Steud. ex A.Rich.
Alepidea pilifera Weim.
Alepidea pusilla Weim.
Alepidea schlechteri H.Wolff
Alepidea serrata Eckl. & Zeyh.
Alepidea setifera N.E.Br.
Alepidea stellata Weim.
Alepidea thodei Dümmer
Alepidea woodii Oliv.
Alepidea wyliei Dümmer

References 

Apioideae
Taxa named by François-Étienne de La Roche
Apioideae genera